A position sensor is a sensor that detects an object's position. A position sensor may indicate the absolute position of the object (its location) or its relative position (displacement) in terms of linear travel, rotational angle or three-dimensional space. Common types of position sensors include the following:

 Capacitive displacement sensor
 Eddy-current sensor
 Hall effect sensor
 Inductive sensor
 Laser Doppler vibrometer (optical)
 Linear variable differential transformer (LVDT)
 Photodiode array
 Piezo-electric transducer (piezo-electric)
 Position encoders:
 Absolute encoder
 Incremental encoder
 Linear encoder
 Rotary encoder
 Potentiometer
 Proximity sensor (optical)
 String potentiometer (also known as a string potentiometer, string encoder or cable position transducer)
 Ultrasonic sensor

See also
List of length, distance, or range measuring devices
Positioning system

Literature
 David S. Nyce: Linear Position Sensors: Theory and Application, New Jersey, John Wiley & Sons Inc. (2004)

Measuring instruments